James Ouchterlony (born 9 August 1973) is a racing cyclist specialising in marathon and cross country mountain bike racing. He represented Scotland at the 2006 Commonwealth Games. He was also the Sports Personality of the year in the Angus Sports Awards 2005.

Major results
2005
 2nd National Marathon Championships
 3rd National XC Championships
2006
 2nd National Marathon Championships
2007
 1st  National Marathon Championships
 1st Overall, NPS Marathon
2008
 6th Marathon, 2008 UCI Mountain Bike World Cup
2015
 4th UCI World Championship XCO MA-40 (Vallnord)

References

External links
Well Done James Ouchterlony – UK National Marathon Champion 2007, Singletrack MTB Magazine, 27 September 2007

1973 births
Living people
Scottish male cyclists
Cyclists at the 2006 Commonwealth Games
Commonwealth Games competitors for Scotland
Cross-country mountain bikers
Marathon mountain bikers
Place of birth missing (living people)